Badnami is a Bollywood film. It was released in 1946.

Cast 
 Geeta Bali 
 Asha Posley
 Balraj Sahni
 Zubeida Begum
 Pran
 Ramlal

References

External links
 

1946 films
1940s Hindi-language films
Indian black-and-white films